Cremospermopsis is a genus of flowering plants belonging to the family Gesneriaceae.

Its native range is Colombia.

Species:

Cremospermopsis cestroides 
Cremospermopsis galaxias 
Cremospermopsis parviflora

References

Gesnerioideae
Gesneriaceae genera